El Sobrante Christian School is a private K-12 Christian school located in El Sobrante, Contra Costa County, California, United States.

References

Christian schools in California
Educational institutions established in 1971
El Sobrante, Contra Costa County, California
Private elementary schools in California
High schools in Contra Costa County, California
Private middle schools in California
Schools in Contra Costa County, California
Private high schools in California
1971 establishments in California